Krisztina Magát (born 2 March 1989 in Budapest, Hungary) is a Hungarian weightlifter. Her best results was silver medal at the 2018 European Weightlifting Championships in Bucharest.

Major results

* After the competition she was fourth place, but later the originally gold medallist Ukrainian Svitlana Cherniavska was disqualified.

Doping sanction
In August 2013 Magát had produce positive doping test at the out of competition control. She used Oxandrolone and she was banned between 23.09.2013 - 23.09.2015.

Personal life
Magát is a kindergarten teacher, in Budapest.

References

External links
 

1988 births
Living people
Hungarian female weightlifters
Hungarian sportspeople in doping cases
Doping cases in weightlifting
European Weightlifting Championships medalists
Sportspeople from Budapest
21st-century Hungarian women